The Zentrale Unterstützungsgruppe Zoll (ZUZ) (Central Customs Support Group) is the police tactical unit of the German Customs Service (Bundeszollverwaltung) and subordinate to the German Customs Investigation Bureau (Zollkriminalamt, ZKA).

History
In response to the increasing violence against law enforcement officers, the ZUZ was formed in 1997 as the customs tactical unit for use when regular officers would be in too much danger. Until that point, the German Customs services requested the service of the SEK units or the GSG 9 for high-risk missions. However, due to the workload of these units, the German Customs Service decided to establish their own special unit for these types of missions.

Recruitment and training
Any member of the German Customs Service can apply for the selection process of the ZUZ.
Requirements are: 
 Not older than 35 years
 Physical and mental fitness

The selection process lasts 14 days and includes physical tests, medical examinations, interviews and aptitude tests.

Upon completion of the selection process, new ZUZ members have to attend a 10-week basic training which is followed by a 48-week advanced training.

Preservation of the various basic skills (i.e., shooting, sport and self-defence) is a top priority on the ZUZ training plan as well as driving and safety training and courses on new technical devices.

Equipment
In addition to an extensive fleet, ZUZ members are armed with the following weapons：
 Glock 17 pistol 
 Glock 26 pistol
 Heckler & Koch MP5 sub-machine gun
 Heckler & Koch G36 assault rifle
 Heckler & Koch HK416 assault rifle

See also
 KSK
 Kampfschwimmer
 GSG 9
 Spezialeinsatzkommando
 Counter-terrorism Rapid Response- Italian Guardia di Finanza similar unit

References

External links

Bundeszollverwaltung
1997 establishments in Germany
Police tactical units